The 1903 World Allround Speed Skating Championships took place at 20 and 21 March 1903 at the ice rink Market Place in Saint Petersburg, Russia.

There was no defending champion. No one won at least three distances and so no World champion was declared.

Allround results 

  * = Fell
 NC = Not classified
 NF = Not finished
 NS = Not started
 DQ = Disqualified
Source: SpeedSkatingStats.com

Rules 
Four distances have to be skated:
 500m
 1500m
 5000m
 10000m

One could only win the World Championships by winning at least three of the four distances, so there would be no World Champion if no skater won at least three distances.

Silver and bronze medals were not awarded.

References 

World Allround Speed Skating Championships, 1903
1903 World Allround
World Allround, 1903
Sports competitions in Saint Petersburg
1903 in the Russian Empire
March 1903 sports events
1900s in Saint Petersburg